α-Pyrrolidinoheptaphenone (PV8, α-PEP, α-PHPP, Aphpp, A-PHPP) is a designer drug of the pyrrolidinophenone class of cathinones.  It is the higher homolog of α-pyrrolidinohexiophenone (α-PHP).

In the United States, α-pyrrolidinoheptaphenone is a Schedule I Controlled Substance.

See also
 α-PHP
 α-PHiP
 α-PCyP
 4F-PV9
 MDPV
 N-Ethylheptedrone

References 

Pyrrolidinophenones